Terrell County Independent School District is a public school district based in the community of Sanderson, Texas, in the United States.

As of 2007, the Texas State Energy Conservation Office awarded the district money due to the colonias served by the district.

Academic achievement
In 2009, the school district was rated "recognized" by the Texas Education Agency.

Schools
Terrell County ISD operates the following schools - 
Sanderson High School
Sanderson Junior High School
Sanderson Elementary School

Special programs

Athletics
Sanderson High School plays six-man football.

See also

List of school districts in Texas

References

External links
 Terrell County Independent School District

School districts in Terrell County, Texas